The Battle of Miahuatlán took place on 3 October 1866 in the vicinity of the current municipality of Miahuatlán de Porfirio Díaz in the state of Oaxaca, Mexico. It was fought between elements of the Mexican republican army under General Porfirio Díaz and troops of the Second Mexican Empire during the Second French intervention in Mexico.

The Imperial troops were defeated, opening the way for Díaz to advance on the city of Oaxaca.

Background
French forces of the Second French Empire invaded Mexico in 1862, and entered Mexico City on 7 June 1863. In July 1863, supported by many conservative Mexicans, they proclaimed a Catholic Empire. The throne was given to an Austrian Archduke who became Maximilian I of Mexico.
The republicans resisted, but with limited success.

However, with the ending of the American Civil War in 1865 the United States began to actively assist the republicans and to put pressure on the French to withdraw, which began in May 1866. Republican forces received supplies in the form of money and weapons to continue the war. Without the same French support during the early battles, the tide turned against the Imperial forces, who lost several battles to the republican forces. At the time of the Battle of Miahuatlán, Díaz was advancing from the south towards the city of Oaxaca, the heart of the southern state.

Battle
Díaz's forces at Miahuatlán were almost out of food and ammunition, drenched by rain and demoralized.

He took a defensive position facing northwest, where he was found and attacked by 1,100 Imperial troops under General Carlos Oronoz assisted by a French officer, Enrique Testard. The attackers bombarded the republican positions from long range, then closed in on them with a skirmishing line followed by three columns. Díaz skillfully held off the attackers, then sent his cavalry across the Miahuatlán river to unexpectedly attack the right rear of the Imperial troops. Facing certain defeat, General Oronoz fled the battle. His forces lost 70 dead and 400 prisoners, against Republican losses of 59 killed and 14 wounded.

The victory was due to Díaz's imaginative use of terrain and deception. He placed riflemen in the Nogales Ravine, and a group of armed peasants in a maguey field opposite them, hidden from view. Díaz then made himself conspicuous on the crest of a hill behind them. His cavalry retreated towards Díaz pursued by the imperial forces, who were caught in a lethal cross-fire from the concealed republican troops.

While Díaz launched a frontal assault led by Manuel González (later to become President of the Republic) on the imperial forces, the surprise cavalry attack from rear decided the day.

Aftermath
As a result of the battle, Díaz's forces were replenished with about 1,000 captured rifles, two field pieces and over 50 mules loaded with ammunition. He was able to continue his advance with little opposition, reaching Oaxaca on 8 October 1866.

In his memoirs, Díaz described the battle as the most strategic and brilliantly fought action during the Second French intervention in Mexico. This victory, and that of the Battle of La Carbonera, gave Díaz national fame and would solidify him as a hero of the war for many decades.

See also
List of battles of the French intervention in Mexico

References

Conflicts in 1866
1866 in Mexico
Battles of the Second French intervention in Mexico
History of Oaxaca
October 1866 events